Milagrosa Mecheba Ebaco (born 12 February 1987), commonly known as Mayka, is an Equatorial Guinean painter and footballer who plays as a midfielder for Primera Madrid club CD Inter Promesas and the Equatorial Guinea women's national team. She also holds Spanish citizenship.

Club career
Mayka started with Torrelodones CF in Segunda División. She suffered a serious injury during the final stretch of the 2010-2011 campaign. She moved to Madrid CFF for the next season.

She joined Segunda División club CDAV San Nicasio in the summer of 2012. She remained there until the middle of the 2013-2014 campaign. Then, she moved to CD Amistades Guadalajara, playing her first match for them on 1 March 2014. Over the years, she became the team captain.

In early 2018, she left her long-time team Amistades Guadalajara to join Segunda División side EMF Fuensalida.

International career
Mayka made her international debut for Equatorial Guinea on 26 November 2017, coming on as a second-half substitute in a 4–0 home friendly win against Comoros.

References

1987 births
Living people
Equatoguinean women's footballers
People from Bata, Equatorial Guinea
Women's association football midfielders
Women's association football forwards
Madrid CFF players
Equatorial Guinea women's international footballers
Equatoguinean expatriate women's footballers
Equatoguinean expatriate sportspeople in Spain
Expatriate women's footballers in Spain
Equatoguinean painters